The 1965-66 Australians drew 1-1 with the touring England team in the 1965-66 Ashes series. They were strong in batting, but weak in bowling and by the end of the series had seven batsmen, an all-rounder, a wicket-keeper and only two specialist bowlers in the team, with the batsman helping out with their part-time bowling skills.

The Captain
Bobby Simpson was a physically compact, highly accomplished batsman with a striking penchant for compiling high scores...He was a pleasant, personable cricketer, and a captain with genuine feeling for his players. Those who watched him will never forget the masterly ease of his slip-catching.
John Arlott
Robert Baddeley Simpson, better known as Bobby Simpson was a cricket prodigy who had a difficult time establishing himself as a Test batsman, taking 30 Tests to make his maiden Test century, 311 against England at Old Trafford in 1964. He had already made a number of big centuries in the Sheffield Shield for New South Wales and Western Australia and in the middle of his career made 159 in Pakistan, 201 in the West Indies, 225 against England and 159 in South Africa. He was a careful opener, but once established had a number of strokes and unlike his regular opening partner Bill Lawry was able to hit the ball attractively. He had been a leg-spinner in his youth and had taken 5/57 against England in 1962-63 and he took 5/59 against India in what was to be his last Test until his 1977 recall. His greatest talent was in the field and held 110 catches in only 62 Tests and was "one of the greatest slip-fielders of all time. He had lightning-quick reflexes and it was rare indeed for a chance to go begging if the ball was anything like catchable." As a captain he was well liked, but more cautious than courageous. He held onto the Ashes with a 1-0 win in England in 1964 - his 762-minute triple century made sure that England would not recover the urn - and a 1-1 draw in 1965-66. He lost 2-1 in the West Indies in 1964-65 and 3-1 in South Africa in 1966-67 and his only other series victory was when he beat India 4-0 at home in 1967–68, when Simpson gave the captaincy to Bill Lawry after the Second Test. This poor record was caused by the weakness of the Australian bowling attack in the late 1960s, which relied heavily on the fast bowling of Garth McKenzie. Simpson first retired in 1968, but returned in 1977 in the midst of the Packer Crisis when Test players deserted regular cricket and Australia were left with a team of debutants and Jeff Thomson. Simpson had been playing grade cricket in the intervening years and returned as Australian captain, beating India 3-2 at home, but losing 3-1 in the West Indies. He asked the Australian Board of Control to promise his place in the 1978-79 Ashes series, but they refused and he took to broadcasting.

Batting
Australia had a long batting line up in the 1965-66 Ashes series and in the Fourth and Fifth Tests they had seven specialist batsmen, the all-rounder Tom Veivers and the wicket-keeper Wally Grout batting at number 9. Bobby Simpson and Bill Lawry were the best opening partnership in the world, being the only opening batsmen to have both made a double century in the same innings as they added a record 382 for the first wicket in the West Indies in 1964-65. Lawry was a "tall, lanky, dour, watchful left-hander, and a better player than he looked...a great fighter, and a splendid resister in a corner", who was once unfairly described as "a corpse with pads on". His 592 runs (84.57) in the series was the most in an Ashes series since Don Bradman's 680 runs (97.14) in 1946–47 and his three centuries were the most since Arthur Morris made three in 1948.
The old hand Grahame Thomas and the tall and ungainly Ian Redpath were used as replacement openers when Simpson was ill or injured and Thomas was kept on after the captain returned, but made little impression. Redpath would later become the main opening batsmen in Ian Chappell's Australian powerful teams of the early 1970s. The imaginative strokemaker Doug Walters was the real find of the series, making 155 on debut and 115 in the Second Test. Later he was found to have a weakness against fast bowling and English bowling conditions, but this was not a problem he faced in 1965-66 and he soared. Bob Cowper made 307 in the Fifth Test, the highest Test century in Australia until Matthew Hayden made 380 against Zimbabwe in 2002–03. A tall, correct left-handed batsmen who was dropped for the Fourth Test because he batted too slowly, he averaged an impressive 75.78 in home Tests but only 33.33 overseas and the difference of 42.45 is a Test match record. Vice-captain Brian Booth a "modest, unobtrusive stylist" failed to make any runs and was dropped when he lost the Third Test in Simpson's absence. Peter Burge was another veteran, a heavyweight front-foot batsman nicknamed 'Burge the Bulge' and whose four Test centuries were all made against the England in times of crisis. He made 120 to save the Second Test, but was dropped due to his otherwise poor form. The young Keith Stackpole and Ian Chappell were brought into the team at the end of the series, but their catching proved to be of more importance than their batting. Tom Veivers was an off-spinning all rounder who averaged 31.26 and made seven 50s in only 21 Tests. Wally Grout was not the best batting wicketkeeper, but he liked to swing the bat about and could make vital runs.

Bowling
Graham McKenzie - with 100 Test wickets to him name before the series started and at the age of 24 - was a fine bowler with a model action, and he and Neil Hawke made a good opening pair, as they had done in England. But they scarcely got any support worthy of the name.
E.W. Swanton
After the retirement of Richie Benaud and Alan Davidson the Australian with the lowest bowling average was Doug Walters at 29.08 and seven England batsmen averaged over 40.00 in the series. Their best bowler was Garth McKenzie, a 6'2" gentle giant he had a knack of taking wickets on flat batting tracks and at 24 who had just become the youngest bowler to take a 100 test wickets. Strangely he was not an automatic choice for Australia and was dropped in favour of Peter Allan in the First Test and almost in the Fourth. Allan had taken 10/61 in the Sheffield Shield, the third best innings return in Australia, and was recalled for the Fourth Test, but was injured and McKenzie returned to take a match-winning 6/48. McKenzie's new-ball partner was Neil Hawke a strong fast-medium bowler who played Aussie Rules football, but like McKenzie ended his career with a Test average of 29. After this the quality of Australian bowling fell away sharply. Alan Connolly was a decent fast-medium bowler, but he failed in the series and in the end Australia used the batsmen Doug Walters as their first change bowler. Similarly the leg-spin of Bobby Simpson, Keith Stackpole and Ian Chappell was pressed into action, as was the off-spin of Bob Cowper and in the Fourth and Fifth Tests Australia only used three specialist bowlers. Peter Philpott took 5/90 in the First Test with his leg-spin, but fell away and David Sincock's slow left-arm wrist-spin failed despite their rarity value. Tom Veivers was a useful lower order batsmen, but his off-spin took few wickets and he could only be used for containment.

Fielding
With their baseball experience Australia were traditionally a stronger fielding side than England. This was Wally Grout's last Test series and at the time his 187 dismissals in 51 Tests was second only to Godfrey Evans's 219 in 91 Tests. He was 30 when he played in his first Test on the 1957-58 South African tour, when he held a record 6 catches in an innings and soon established himself as the best wicket-keeper in the world. Bobby Simpson was one of the greatest slip fielders in cricket, Bill Lawry and Grahame Thomas were noted outfielders and Doug Walters was good anywhere. Ian Chappell and Keith Stackpole took some fine catches in the last two Tests and Garth McKenzie took 4 catches in the outfield.

Test statistics

First Test - Brisbane

See Main Article - 1965-66 Ashes series

Second Test - Melbourne

See Main Article - 1965-66 Ashes series

Third Test - Sydney

See Main Article - 1965-66 Ashes series

Fourth Test - Adelaide

See Main Article - 1965-66 Ashes series

Fifth Test - Melbourne

See Main Article - 1965-66 Ashes series

References

Bibliography
 John Arlott, John Arlott's 100 Greatest Batsmen, Queen Anne Press, 1986
 Peter Arnold, The Illustrated Encyclopaedia of World of Cricket, W.H. Smith, 1985
 Ashley Brown, A Pictorial History of Cricket, Bison Books Ltd, 1988
 David Gower, Heroes and Contemporaries, Granada Publishing Ltd, 1985
 Tom Graveney and Norman Miller, The Ten Greatest Test Teams, Sidgewick and Jackson, 1988
 John Snow, Cricket Rebel: An Autobiography, Littlehampton Book Services Ltd, 1976
 E.W. Swanton, Swanton in Australia with MCC 1946-1975, Fontana, 1977

Annual reviews
 Playfair Cricket Annual 1966
 Wisden Cricketers' Almanack 1966

Further reading
 Geoffrey Boycott, Boycott: The Autobiography, Pan Books, 2006
 Colin Cowdrey, M. C. C. The Autobiography of a Cricketer, Coronet Books, 1977
 Bill Frindall, The Wisden Book of Test Cricket 1877-1978, Wisden, 1979
 Chris Harte, A History of Australian Cricket, Andre Deutsch, 1993
 Ken Kelly and David Lemmon, Cricket Reflections: Five Decades of Cricket Photographs, Heinemann, 1985
 Mark Peel, The Last Roman: A Biography of Colin Cowdrey, Andre Deutsch Ltd, 1999
 Ray Robinson, On Top Down Under, Cassell, 1975
 E.W. Swanton(ed), The Barclays World of Cricket, Collins, 1986

External links
 Cricket Archive

1965 in Australian cricket
1966 in Australian cricket
Australian cricket seasons from 1945–46 to 1969–70